The SD20 is the product of a rebuilding program by the Illinois Central Gulf's Paducah Shops as a conversion from the EMD SD7, EMD SD24, SD24B (cabless), and EMD SD35 locomotives. The program involved rebuilding the 567 engine to 645E with 2000 horsepower rating, eliminating the turbocharger if equipped with one, upgrading the electronics to Dash 2 technology, and adding cabs to the B units. A total of 42 units were rebuilt. Original heritage of the rebuilt units was 3 Union Pacific SD7s, 4 Union Pacific SD24s, 10 Union Pacific SD24Bs, 21 Southern SD24s, and 4 Baltimore and Ohio SD35s. Many of the units to be rebuilt were purchased from Precision National. Three of the ex-Southern SD24s wore Precision reporting marks. The locomotives were rebuilt between August 1979 and December 1982. Road Numbers assigned were 2000–2041. Unit 2041 was the last Paducah rebuild.

Usage
Many SD20s are still in use with leasing companies and regional and shortline railroads. The Wisconsin and Southern Railroad and Indiana Harbor Belt are both notable second and third owners of the SD20. On January 22, 2008, the Wisconsin Southern ran its last run using an SD20, all have now been sold.

References
Extra 2200 South Jan Feb Mar 1992 Issue #94 "Illinois Central Railroad, Illinois Central Gulf, Illinois Central Part 2: Paducah Switchers and SD20s" pp. 21–23, 31–32.
https://web.archive.org/web/20110718122106/http://www.wsorrailroad.com/gallery/sd20farewell.html

External links

Wisconsin Southern SD20 Farewell

Electro-Motive Diesel locomotives
Standard gauge locomotives of the United States